Ferenc Bene jr. (born 7 September 1978) is a Hungarian football manager and a former footballer who currently works as an assistant coach for Diósgyőri VTK in the Hungarian premier division OTP Bank Liga.  He is the son of legendary Hungarian striker Ferenc Bene.

On his playing career Bene spent several seasons in the Hungarian lower divisions and played one season in the Finnish top division Veikkausliiga for FC Jazz.

References

External links 
Ferenc Bene jr. Official Homepage

1978 births
Footballers from Budapest
Hungarian footballers
Hungarian football managers
Vasas SC players
Dorogi FC footballers
BKV Előre SC footballers
Soroksári TE footballers
Hungarian expatriate footballers
Expatriate footballers in Finland
Veikkausliiga players
FC Jazz players
Living people
Association football forwards
Vasas SC managers